Arnar Pétursson (born 12 March 1991) is an Icelandic long-distance runner. In 2018, he competed in the men's half marathon at the 2018 IAAF World Half Marathon Championships held in Valencia, Spain. He finished in 116th place.

In 2019, he won the bronze medal in the men's 10,000 metres event at the 2019 Games of the Small States of Europe held Budva, Montenegro.

References

External links 
 

Living people
1991 births
Place of birth missing (living people)
Icelandic male long-distance runners
Icelandic male marathon runners
Icelandic male steeplechase runners